Iva Perovanović (born 1 September 1983) is Montenegrin female basketball player. She currently plays for Beşiktaş JK and the Montenegrin national team. She competed in the 2011 Eurobasket.

References

External links

Profile at FIBA Europe
Profile at eurobasket.com

1983 births
Living people
Sportspeople from Podgorica
Montenegrin expatriate basketball people in Italy
Montenegrin expatriate basketball people in Poland
Montenegrin expatriate basketball people in Russia
Montenegrin expatriate basketball people in Spain
Montenegrin expatriate basketball people in Turkey
Montenegrin women's basketball players
Centers (basketball)
Beşiktaş women's basketball players
CB Islas Canarias players